Kathleen L. Peterson Abiad (born January 19, 1969) is the former head women's basketball coach at Cleveland State University.

Career
In 2008, she led the Vikings to their first Horizon League tournament championship and first-ever appearance in the NCAA tournament.  After that season, she signed a contract extension through 2013.  She came to the Vikings after serving as an assistant coach for the Indiana Hoosiers, Eastern Illinois Panthers, and Wisconsin Badgers.

Head coaching record

References 

1969 births
Living people
American women's basketball coaches
American women's basketball players
Cleveland State Vikings women's basketball coaches
Eastern Illinois Panthers women's basketball coaches
Indiana Hoosiers women's basketball coaches
Wisconsin Badgers women's basketball coaches
Indiana University Bloomington alumni
People from River Falls, Wisconsin
Wisconsin–Stevens Point Pointers women's basketball players